Finn Lange (October 10, 1895 – December 7, 1976) was a Norwegian actor. He was born in Gjøvik. He performed in theater (at the Trondheim National Theater and the National Theater in Oslo) and appeared in several films.

Filmography
 1970: Døden i gatene 
 1943: Sangen til livet as Jørgen Roll, a factory director
 1938: Eli Sjursdotter as the priest
 1931: Den store barnedåpen as the chaplain
 1925: Fager er lien as Kristian, a Salvation Army member

References

External links
 
 Finn Lange at the Swedish Film Database

1895 births
1976 deaths
Norwegian male stage actors
Norwegian male film actors
Norwegian male silent film actors
20th-century Norwegian male actors
People from Gjøvik